Shahram  is a masculine Persian given name.

The name is made of two parts, 'shah' meaning king and 'ram' meaning doe (female deer). The meaning behind a "king of female deer" implies a benevolent ruler who cares for their subjects.

List of people with the given name Shahram 

 Shahram Amiri (1978–2016), Iranian nuclear scientist
 Shahrum Kashani, Iranian singer
 Shahram Mahmoudi (born 1988), Iranian volleyball player
 Shahram Nazeri, Iranian singer
 Shahram Shabpareh, Iranian singer
 Shahram Taghavi, barrister

Persian masculine given names